Varattar River is one of the tributaries of the river Kalpathipuzha. Kalpathipuzha is one of the main  tributaries of the Bharathapuzha River, the second-longest river in Kerala, south India.

See also
Bharathapuzha River - Main river
Kalpathipuzha - One of the main  tributaries of the Bharathapuzha River

Other tributaries of the river Kalpathipuzha
 Korayar
 Varattar
 Walayar
 Malampuzha

Bharathappuzha